Kramer is a Capital MetroRail commuter rail station in Austin, Texas.  It is located in Northwest Austin near the corner of Kramer and Braker Lanes. At 1 mile walking distance, Kramer is the closest station to The Domain, a major high-density business, retail, and residential center.

Kramer Station is slated to close upon the opening of two new stations: McKalla Place to the South and Broadmoor to the North.

Bus connections
 #392 Braker
 #466 Kramer

References

External links
 Kramer station overview
 Station from Kramer Ln from Google Maps Street View

Capital MetroRail stations in Austin
Railway stations in the United States opened in 2010
Railway stations in Travis County, Texas